Raphaël Babet (27 June 1894 – 30 August 1957) was a French politician.

Babet was born in Saint-Pierre, Réunion.  He represented the Democratic and Socialist Union of the Resistance (UDSR) in the Constituent Assembly elected in 1946 and in the National Assembly from 1946 to 1957.

He is also remembered for his work in founding the new town of Babetville on the Sakay river in Madagascar, for settlers from La Réunion.

References

1894 births
1957 deaths
People from Saint-Pierre, Réunion
Politicians of Réunion
Democratic and Socialist Union of the Resistance politicians
Members of the Constituent Assembly of France (1946)
Deputies of the 1st National Assembly of the French Fourth Republic
Deputies of the 2nd National Assembly of the French Fourth Republic
Deputies of the 3rd National Assembly of the French Fourth Republic